Florentin (formerly Graham Bell which rebranded in 2021) is an Israeli DJ and record producer duo composed of Assaf Tuvia and Gal Abutbul, from Jerusalem, Israel. They begun their career as ghost producers and sound engineers.

Their song "The Sound Of Letting Go (Tribute To Yotam)" alongside SIVAN, was chosen at #386 of A State of Trance TOP 1000 of all time.

Discography

Singles as Graham Bell

Remixes as Graham Bell

Singles as Florentin/FLRNTN

Remixes as Florentin/FLRNTN

References

Israeli DJs

1988 births
Living people